Northstar may refer to:

 Polaris, a star

Arts and entertainment
 Northstar (band), an emo band from Alabama
 Northstar (rap group), a rap group affiliated with the Wu-Tang Clan
 "Northstar", a 2019 song by XXXTentacion from the album Bad Vibes Forever
 Northstar (character), a Marvel Comics superhero
 Northstar, a character in the video game Titanfall 2

Transportation
 Northstar Line, a commuter rail line in Minnesota
 Northstar engine series, a GM Premium V8 engine
 Northstar System, Cadillac's trademarked name for automobile features, including the Northstar V8 engine

Other
 NorthStar, a global producer of lead-acid batteries and battery cabinets
 Northstar California, a ski resort in the Lake Tahoe area of California, United States
 NorthStar Center, a young adult therapeutic transition program, located in Bend, Oregon, United States
 Northstar Group, a Southeast Asian private equity fund manager
 Northstar Island, an artificial island in the Beaufort Sea north of Alaska, United States
 Northstar, a wine label produced by the Chateau Ste. Michelle Wine Estates division of Altria

See also 

 
 Star (disambiguation)
 North (disambiguation)
 Nordstar (disambiguation)
 North Star (disambiguation)
 Northern Star (disambiguation)
 Star of the North (disambiguation)
 Estrella del norte (disambiguation)
 Estrela do Norte (disambiguation)
 Étoile du Nord (disambiguation)
 Nordstern (disambiguation)